New Home is an unincorporated community in Bates County, in the U.S. state of Missouri.

History
New Home was platted in 1869, and named after a local estate of the same name. A post office called New Home was established in 1872, and remained in operation until 1902.

References

Unincorporated communities in Bates County, Missouri
Unincorporated communities in Missouri